Native New Yorker may refer to:

 A person who was born in or spent their formative years in New York City
 Native New Yorker (film)
 "Native New Yorker" (song)